Ronald Carr (born 12 January 1938) was a South African cricketer. He was a right-handed batsman and leg-break bowler. Carr was born in Johannesburg.

Carr made two first-class appearances during his cricketing career, the first coming for Essex in the 1960 season, following two seasons of action in the Second XI, with whom he was a first-team player during 1959. Carr's second and final first-class appearance came four years later, playing for Transvaal in an innings defeat against the MCC.

Carr was never dismissed during his first-class career, playing as a tailender.

External links
Ronald Carr at CricketArchive 

1938 births
South African cricketers
Living people
Essex cricketers
Gauteng cricketers